Barrel Organ Museum Haarlem (Dutch: Draaiorgelmuseum Haarlem) is a museum in Haarlem in the Netherlands. Next to the presentation of a variety of barrel organs, accessory objects and documentation material, there is a ball room where music of the organs is being played. The museum was opened in 1969 by the foundation Het Kunkels Orgel. Since 2014 it has its current location at a business park at the Küppersweg.

History
The history of the museum starts in 1958 when a big dance organ was obtained, made by Marenghi/Carl Frei of organ builder Kunkels from Roermond. The goal was the preservation of the organ for the future, for which the foundation Het Kunkels Orgel was brought to existence in 1962. In the course of ten years the organ was restored. At the opening in 1969 it became the central piece of the barrel organ museum. The first establishment was in a former factory building. In the following decades the collection was complemented with own and borrowed barrel organs. Among these, one can find some unique, historic pieces.

Shortly before the beginning of the next century, the survival of the museum was endangered. For the rescue of the museum a successful protest marsh was held through the city of Haarlem by steady visitors with forty barrel organs. Since 9 May 2014 it is located at a business park at the Küppersweg 3.

Collection and activities 
The museum shows a collection of different pieces, like some dance, cafe, street and fair organs. Het Kunkels Orgel is a concert organ and the biggest of its type in Europe. There are also theater organs, like Lady Compton, that were used for the musical accompaniment of silent films. The eldest organ in the museum dates from 1900.

In the museum concerts with organs are held frequently. One of the used instruments is De Lange Gavioli that can be heard since a long restoration was fulfilled in 2016. An organ that was borrowed for some years, was the Pod (nl), a sister organ of the Schuyt; the latter one was built by Carl Frei, shortly later than Het Kunkels Orgel. Next to that, the museum frequently organizes barrel organ events.

Impression

See also 
 List of museums in the Netherlands
 List of music museums

References 

Museums in North Holland
Musical instrument museums